Vladimir Ladosha, Rus. Владимир Ладоша, is a Russian sprint canoeist who competed in the late 1990s. He won six medals at the ICF Canoe Sprint World Championships with two golds (C-4 200 m and C-4 500 m: both 1999), a silver (C-2 200 m: 1997), and three bronzes (C-4 200 m: 1998, C-4 500 m: 1998, 2001).

References

Living people
Russian male canoeists
Year of birth missing (living people)
ICF Canoe Sprint World Championships medalists in Canadian